Bruce W. Anderson "Buzz" (January 17, 1948) was an American politician, teacher, and businessman.

Anderson was born in Luverne, Rock County, Minnesota and graduated from Luverne High School in 1966. He went to Concordia College in Saint Paul, Minnesota Anderson received his two bachelor's degrees in political science and social studies education from Minnesota State University, Mankato. He was a social studies teacher and was a journalist who worked for the Mankato Free Press. Anderson also worked for the Minnesota Department of Agriculture. He lived in Slayton, Murray County, Minnesota with his wife and family. Anderson served in the Minnesota House of Representatives from 1977 to 1982 and was a Democrat.

References

1948 births
Living people
People from Luverne, Minnesota
People from Slayton, Minnesota
Journalists from Minnesota
Schoolteachers from Minnesota
Concordia University (Saint Paul, Minnesota) alumni
Minnesota State University, Mankato alumni
Democratic Party members of the Minnesota House of Representatives